Villaldama is a municipality in the state of Nuevo Leon, Mexico extending over 870.5 km². Ciudad Villaldama is its principal town and seat of government.  It is located in the northern part of the state, coordinates 26º30´ N  and 100º25´ W., with an elevation of 420 m above sea level. It limits to the north with the municipality of Lampazos de Naranjo and to the south with Salinas Victoria; to the east with Sabinas Hidalgo and the west with Bustamante. It is located approximately 96 km from Monterrey, the state capital.
Villaldama is a town in Mexico, located in Nuevo León. The locality had its maximum development when its name was Real of Mines of San Pedro Mouth of Lions, during the mining splendor of the New Kingdom of Leon towards 1690, its current name is due to the hero of the Independence of Mexico: Juan Aldama, and it changed in the year 1812.

Population

Per the 2000 federal census, there were 4,247 people living in the municipality of Villadama, of which 2,114 were male and 2,133 were female.

Location

It Is located in the northern part of the state, at coordinates 100 º 25 ´ longitude West and 26 º 30 ´ north latitude, at a height of 420 meters above sea level. It is Confined to the north by the municipality of Mops de Naranjo and to the south by Salinas Victoria; To the east with Sabinas Hidalgo and to the west with Bustamante. Its approximate distance to the capital of the state is 96 km. 4 The way to arrive is to travel the Road Colombia of the State of Nuevo León.

History

In The northern region of the state inhabited the aboriginal groups known as the Alazapas, Toboso Apache and Catapaches. Colonization in the north of the state was slower than in other states of the country. The Spaniards tried to colonize at the end of the EIGHTEENTH century and were rejected by the aboriginal peoples. It Corresponds to the Tlaxcalans coming from the center of the country to facilitate the colonization and the founding of towns like that of San Miguel de Aguayo of the New Tlaxcala, today Bustamante; The Real of San Pedro de Boca de Leones, today Villaldama; The Real of Santiago of the Sabinas, today Sabinas Hidalgo; And the Mission of Our Lady of Sorrows of the Point of Lampazas of Naranjo.
In 1690 was founded the Real San Pedro de Boca de Leones by Captain Juan de Villarreal, Francisco de Bobarbarigoo and Tlaxcala Antonio Gonzalez who discovered the first mines in the Valley of Boca de Leones. 

By consolidating the triumph of independence changed the political life of the country and what was the new Kingdom of León was called the State of Nuevo León. The Real went to the political category of Villa on March 17, 1828. In 1830 of new account the Old Mines were exploited by Don Darío Guerrero, from where he obtained the silver he gave to frame the painting of the Virgin of Guadalupe in the temple of the same name. 

The armed Struggle of 1910, barely lasted six months, which is why mining worked normally. Between The years 1914 and 1918 in the Hacienda of Guadalupe were built four vertical kilns and three of rotation, in Old Mines a vertical oven was installed. The mining production was silver and zinc. Minas Viejas is located in the Sierra of the same name. During The revolutionary movement, a bout was recorded, which is remembered for being very bloody, on May 3, 1913. The revolutionary troops were in command of the Lord Jesus Carranza, who triumphed over the federal troops under the command of Colonel Villanueva.

Currently the Rancho Minas Viejas is owned by Don Pedro Elizaldi Cantu, who worked as a miner in these properties more than 40 years ago, and who 20 years ago was one of the mayors of Lampazas de Naranjo, Nuevo León.

Climate

The climate is extreme and arid, with high temperatures and low precipitation. The mean annual temperature is 25 °C. Summer temperatures range from 39 to 43 °C. Winter temperatures can reach -4 °C.  Average annual precipitation is 500 mm. However, rainfall can be as high as 750 mm during rainy periods and as low as 340 mm during dry seasons.

Tourism

Villaldama has interesting architectural attractions such as The Municipal Palace, a classic colonial building built between 1906 and 1907.
The Church of Our Lady of Guadalupe shows the architectural style of the 16TH century.
The Ancient Temple of St. Peter The Apostle, of rustic construction and currently used as an outdoor experimental theatre.
The Hermitage of the Holy Cross located at 300 meters from the municipal head, the only church in the state with a complete Viacrucis in its staircase, known for its inhabitants as The Hermitage of La Loma from where you can see all Villaldama Rancho Real de Minas Viejas, oriented to the preservation, conservation and reproduction of flora and fauna, located in an important mining area, where silver, lead and gold was exploited at the end of the 17TH century.
Activities such as mine exploration, mountain biking, bird watching, astronomy and photographic safari can be carried out. 
Viewpoint known as "Volcano of the Air" from which you can see an impressive landscape.

The locality has four lodging centres: 
Hotel María Luisa
Hotel Aurora
Hotel Villa Alreta
Rancho Real de Minas Viejas.

Culture

You Have to visit the Municipal Museum, in it are exhibited antiques of the region and photographs that show the transformation of the village over the years; It also has a space for pictorial exhibitions and a multipurpose room and is located on the side of the Church of Our Lady of Guadalupe.

Gastronomy

The Municipality of Villaldama is famous for the number of good bakeries it has had throughout its history. Throughout the municipality they find a wide variety of bakeries, which still use traditional stone ovens, where you can buy empanadas (pumpkin, pineapple, caramel, among others), volcanoes, Coyotas, hojarascas, among other pieces of bread.

Popular Fiestas

Feria de la Santa Cruz: 26 April through 3 May.

Illustrious Characters

Of Villaldama are originating some illustrious personages, like the baseball player: Epitacio  "La Mala " Torres and the lawyer and former Senator of the Republic: Angel Santos Cervantes, among others. 
David Carrillo González, (Villaldama, Nuevo León October 29, 1920, State of Mexico, December 16, 2015.). Dean of the Mexican caricature, he has been President and Founding Partner of the Mexican Society of Caricaturists; Thanks to his vision the Museum of the Caricature is created and a showcase contains his work and personal objects. The Founders ' Hall bears its name. His work has been disseminated in newspapers of greater circulation such as Universal, Excelsior and the Sun of Mexico. In Television He worked in Duel of Cartoonists, alternating with Cabral, Freyre and Isaac.  He Has exhibited throughout the Mexican Republic and in cities in the United States. He'S Got eight books published. In 1939 he made his first cover in Magazines Magazine; Then he collaborated in the newspapers The Universal Illustrated and The Afternoon where he began as a political caricaturist. In 1945 Carrillo paints a large format box commissioned by the Pan American Legion, in which he captured among others the figures of George Washington, José Martí, Hidalgo, Morelos, Juárez, Chian-Kai-Chek, De Gaulle, Manuel Ávila, Camacho, Roosevelt, etc. This work was titled "Continental Fraternity" was given to then President Roosevelt, by the Government of Mexico and the Pan American Legion.

Carrillo's caricature uses the drawing to dialogue through a benevolent and scathing language, accessible to all. The satire and parody of Carrillo's political caricatures have contributed to a more critical and detailed look at the historical episodes of national life.

Main Population Centers

The municipality of Villaldama has 43 population centers, the principal ones being:

Ciudad Villaldama. Main population center and seat of municipal government. Pop. 3,000 (approx.), located 96 km from Monterrey, the state capitol.
El Potrero. Pop. 733, located 12 km from Ciudad Villaldama.
Santa Fe. Pop. 203, located 5 km from Ciudad Villaldama...

External links
Villaldama Website 

Municipalities of Nuevo León